Dao Yin Yang Sheng Gong is a form of Qigong system originated in China by Zhang Guangde, a Chinese martial artist and a former professor at the Beijing Sport University. It integrates physical movement with mental cultivation and controlled breathing.

The system was recognized and integrated into China's education curriculum in sports and medical schools by the Ministry of Health of the People's Republic of China in 1990. The system has been adopted by hospitals for the treatment of diseases, and it's been practiced in other countries such as France and Portugal.

References

Chinese martial arts
Biofield therapies
Traditional Chinese medicine
Alternative medicine
Healing